Sydney Frederick Ween (4 October 1904 – 2 July 1974) was an Australian rules footballer who won a South Australian National Football League (SANFL) premiership in 1928 with the Port Adelaide Football Club.

References

Australian rules footballers from South Australia
Port Adelaide Football Club (SANFL) players
Port Adelaide Football Club players (all competitions)
1904 births
1974 deaths